Coreopsis lanceolata, commonly known as lanceleaf coreopsis, lanceleaf tickseed, lance-leaved coreopsis, or sand coreopsis, is a North American species of tickseed in the family Asteraceae.

Description
The plant produces yellow flower heads singly at the top of a naked flowering stalk, each head containing both ray florets and disc florets. Leaves higher up the stem are sessile and may be unlobed or pinnately lobed. The stem leaves are opposite and generally appear only on the lower half of the stem.

Etymology
The genus name Coreopsis means "bug-like"; it comes from the Greek words "koris", meaning "bug" and "opsis", meaning "like". The genus name, as well as the common name, tickseed, comes from the fact that the seeds are small and resemble ticks. The specific epithet lanceolata refers to the shape of the leaves.

Distribution and habitat
It is native to the eastern and central parts of the United States and naturalized in Canada, the western United States, Mesoamerica, South America, South Africa and eastern Australia. Under natural conditions, it is found in open woodlands, prairies, plains, glades, meadows, and savannas.

As an invasive plant outside of USA
Introduced to Japan and China as an ornamental species and later used extensively in greenification projects, particularly along river banks and railways, Coreopsis lanceolata is now known to be outcompeting native plant life and has since 2006 been labeled an invasive species by the Invasive Alien Species Act. The cultivation, transplantation, sale, or purchase of Coreopsis lanceolata is now prohibited and the plant has become the subject of a nationwide destruction campaign, even earning a spot on the Ecological Society of Japan's 100 Worst Invasive Species list.
The species is also considered an invasive weed in Eastern Australia.

Ecology
Flowers bloom April to June. Many insects are attracted to the plant's nectar and pollen, including bees, wasps, butterflies, moths, flies, and beetles. Birds and small mammals eat the achenes. The plant can spread to form colonies.

Cultivation
Coreopsis lanceolata is useful for pollinator restoration in large urban cities, providing a food source for animals that drink the nectar and/or eat the seed. The plant should not be over watered as it will flop over. It may be restricted by growing in containers or in lawns that tend to be mowed. It requires little maintenance, although deadheading is beneficial. 

It prefers a sandy, well-drained soil.  Heavy, clay-based soil retains moisture in winter months, which can kill many species. However, because C. lanceolata is rhizomatous (having underground stems), it is well-adapted to withstand extremes in soil moisture (both wet and dry). Adding compost to heavy soil can improve drainage as can creating a mounded bed, allowing the planting area to shed rain faster than the ground around it. It thrives in full sun (4–6 hours of direct sunlight per day).

References

External links

 United States Department of Agriculture information and pictures — Coreopsis lanceolata 
 Bioimages, Vanderbilt University photos + drawings
 Jepson Manual Treatment: Coreopsis lanceolata

lanceolata
Flora of North America
Natural history of the California chaparral and woodlands
Plants described in 1753
Taxa named by Carl Linnaeus
Garden plants of North America